Ipermestra is an opera libretto by Pietro Metastasio first set by Johann Adolph Hasse 8 January 1744, and in the November of the same year by Christoff Willibald Gluck.

Plot
The story is based on that of Hypermnestra (Ὑπερμνήστρα) in Greek mythology, the daughter of Danaus and the ancestor of the Danaids. The story had already been the theme of earlier operas including Hipermestra, by Francesco Cavalli 1658, and operas Ipermestra by Geminiano Giacomelli 1724, Antonio Vivaldi (1728 lost), Francesco Feo 1736, Giovanni Battista Ferrandini 1741, Rinaldo da Capua 1744.

Settings of Metastasio's libretto
Ipermestra (Hasse), opera by Johann Adolf Hasse, Jan. 1744
Ipermestra (Gluck), opera by Christoff Willibald Gluck, Nov. 1744 - Aria "Non hai cor per un'impresa" recorded by Daniel Behle, Armonia Atenea and George Petrou
Ipermestra, opera by Egidio Duni Teatro Falcone, Genoa 1748
Ipermestra, opera by Ferdinando Bertoni  Teatro San Samuele, Venice 1749
Ipermestra, opera by Niccolò Jommelli Spoleto, 1751
Ipermestra, opera by Pasquale Cafaro, first setting, Naples 1751
Ipermestra, opera by Andrea Adolfati 1752, Modena		
Ipermestra, opera by Davide Perez 1754, Lisbon		
Ipermestra, opera by Giuseppe Re 1755, Teatro Solerio Alessandria		
Ipermestra, opera by Baldassare Galuppi 1758, Teatro Regio Ducale Milan
Ipermestra, opera by Ignazio Fiorillo 1759, Braunschweig		
Ipermestra, opera by Johann Ernst Eberlin	1761, Salzburg	
Ipermestra, opera by Pasquale Cafaro 1761 second setting, Teatro San Carlo, Naples - an aria "Gonfio tu vedi il fiume" recorded by Franco Fagioli for the recital Arias for Caffarelli
Ipermestra, opera by Giuseppe Sarti 1766, Teatro Argentina, Rome, then 1797 King’s Theatre, Haymarket,  London	
Ipermestra, opera by Gian Francesco de Majo, 1768	Teatro San Carlo, Naples - to date the only recording of a setting of the libretto made in 1963 by RAI conducted by :it:Armando La Rosa Parodi. Cast included Emilia Cundari (Ipermestra), Franco Ventriglia (Danao), Herbert Handt (Linceo), Bianca Maria Casoni (Elpince), Mario Boriello (Plistene), Robert El Haage (Adrasto).
Ipermestra, opera by Josef Mysliveček 1769, Teatro della Pergola, Florence 
Ipermestra, opera by Niccolò Piccinni 1772, Teatro San Carlo, Naples		
Ipermestra, opera by Gian Francesco Fortunati 1773, Teatro di Corte, Modena		
Ipermestra, opera by Johann Gottlieb Naumann 1774, Teatro San Benedetto, Venice
Ipermestra, opera by Raimondo Mei	1778, Teatro Prini, Pavia		
Ipermestra, opera by Vicente Martín y Soler, 1780, Teatro San Carlo,	Naples	
Ipermestra, opera by Salvatore Rispoli 1785, Teatro alla Scala, Milan
Ipermestra, opera by Gennaro Astarita 1789, Teatro San Benedetto, Venice	
Ipermestra, opera by Giovanni Paisiello 1791, Teatro Nuovo, Padua		
Ipermestra, opera by Francesco Morlacchi 1810, Teatro Argentina, Rome
Ipermestra, second opera by Saverio Mercadante 1827, Teatro de São Carlos Lisbon on the libretto by Metastasio	- Mercadante had previously set another Ipermestra 1825, Teatro San Carlo, Naples, on a libretto by Luigi Ricciuti
Ipermestra, opera by Baltasar Saldoni	1838, Teatro del la Cruz, Madrid	
Ipermestra, opera by Ramón Carnicer	1843, Liceo, Saragossa

References

Libretti by Metastasio